Joseph Linklater  (12 March 1876 – 25 April 1961) was a Reform Party Member of Parliament.

Military service
Linklater saw active service as a private in the 6th New Zealand Contingent during the Second Boer War. During World War I he was a second lieutenant in the New Zealand Services Motor-Service Corps.

Political career

He was elected to the Manawatu electorate in the 1922 general election after Edward Newman retired, and held the electorate until he was defeated by Labour's Lorrie Hunter in 1935.

In 1935, Linklater was awarded the King George V Silver Jubilee Medal. He was appointed an Officer of the Order of the British Empire for services in connection with the supervision of disabled servicemen's farms in the 1949 New Year Honours.

Death
Linklater died at Foxton in 1961 and was buried at Kelvin Grove Cemetery, Palmerston North.

References

1876 births
1961 deaths
New Zealand military personnel of the Second Boer War
New Zealand military personnel of World War I
Reform Party (New Zealand) MPs
New Zealand Officers of the Order of the British Empire
Unsuccessful candidates in the 1935 New Zealand general election
Burials at Kelvin Grove Cemetery
Members of the New Zealand House of Representatives
New Zealand MPs for North Island electorates